Pseudopenilia bathyalis is a species of diplostracan, described in 2004, that lives at depths of  in the anoxic zone of the Black Sea. Originally described in the family Sididae, it was transferred to its own family, the Pseudopenilidae, in 2008.

References

Cladocera
Monotypic arthropod genera
Branchiopoda genera